Francisco 'Paco' José Camarasa Castellar (born 27 September 1967) is a Spanish former footballer who played mainly as a central defender.

Club career
Camarasa was born in Rafelbunyol, Valencian Community. For 13 professional seasons he played solely with local club Valencia CF, making his first-team debut during 1987–88 (one game, as the Che had just returned from the Segunda División). Eventually, he became an undisputed starter, making 333 competitive appearances.

Towards the end of his career, injuries and loss of form limited Camarasa to just 11 La Liga matches over four campaigns. He played a minor part in Valencia's 1999 conquest of the Copa del Rey, retiring in June of the following year at nearly 33 years of age.

Subsequently, Camarasa remained working at the Mestalla Stadium as a match delegate. In March 2020, he was one of five persons connected to the organisation that tested positive for COVID-19 virus during the coronavirus pandemic in Spain.

International career
Camarasa earned 14 caps for Spain, and was in the squad for the 1994 FIFA World Cup, appearing 13 minutes against Germany in the group stage after coming on as a substitute for Pep Guardiola and playing the entire round-of-16 win over Switzerland (3–0).

Honours
Copa del Rey: 1998–99
UEFA Intertoto Cup: 1998

See also
List of one-club men

References

External links

CiberChe biography and stats 

1967 births
Living people
People from Horta Nord
Sportspeople from the Province of Valencia
Spanish footballers
Footballers from the Valencian Community
Association football defenders
La Liga players
Segunda División B players
Tercera División players
Valencia CF Mestalla footballers
Valencia CF players
Spain international footballers
1994 FIFA World Cup players
Spanish football managers
Segunda División B managers
Valencia CF Mestalla managers
Valencia CF non-playing staff